Kottathur is a settlement in Ayroor village situated on the eastern part of Ayroor Village of Pathanamthitta district in Kerala state, India. The Pamba River flows by the southern side of the settlement, providing fertile soil.  The settlement is in the parliamentary constituency of Pathanamthitta; the representative is Mr.Anto Antony.

Geography
The Pamba river and the surrounding hills and valleys make Kottathur one of the most picturesque places in Ayrioor. Residents of Kottathur cultivate coconut, rubber, tapioca, plantains, peppers, arackanut, cashews, nutmeg, rice, and many different types of fruits and vegetables.

Economy
One of the specialties is the vibrant NRI community in Kottathur whose remittance resulted in a big change in the economy during the past 30 years.
(Gulf-American-Malaya) in Ayroor.

Demographics
Various sections of Christianity and Hinduism co-exist harmoniously. Followers of St. Thomas Christians, the Syrian Mar Thoma, the Syrian Orthodox churches, pentecostal churches form the predominant Churches in Kottathur.

Temples
Main Hindu temple- Ayroor Puthiyakavu Devi temple is on the bank of river Pampa.  Makara Bharani festival is one of the famous festivals celebrated in the Temple.

Boat Races
Kottathur Palliyodam won awards in the Aranmula Boat Race on several occasions.

Shree Narayana Group
SNDP [Sree Narayana Dharma Paripalanam] is a landmark building on the Puthiakavu - Thekumkal road with a statue of Sri Narayana Guru, a reformist and Guru highly respected by the people of Kerala especially the Ezhava community.  The building was built in 1949-50. The birth day of Sri Narayana Guru is Celebrated with lot of enthusiasm with a procession, fire work and pancha vadyam on the 'Chathayam'day of the Malayalam month Chingam.

Nair Community
NSS [Nair Service Society] building on Vettikadu is a landmark building.

Post Office
Kottathur post office is situated at Mathappara.

References 

All pages needing cleanup
Villages in Pathanamthitta district